James F. Smith (August 15, 1923September 11, 2007) was a Michigan politician.

Early life and education
Smith was born on August 15, 1923, in Davison, Michigan. Smith attended Michigan State University and Amherst College.

Career
Smith served in the United States Army in World War II from 1943 to 1946.

Smith worked as a businessman before his political career. Smith served in local government of Davison, at different times serving there on the city council and later as mayor. Smith also served on the Genesee County Board of Supervisors. On November 8, 1966, Smith was elected to the Michigan House of Representatives where he represented the 79th district from January 1, 1967, to January 1, 1973. On November 7, 1972, Smith was elected to the Michigan House of Representatives where he represented the 83rd district from January 1, 1974, to January 1, 1977.

Personal life
On September 14, 1946, Smith married Emma Jean Pearson. Together they had three children. Smith was a member of Veterans of Foreign Wars and the Elks. Smith was Baptist.

Death
Smith died on September 11, 2007, in Davison. His residence at the time of his death was Charlevoix, Michigan. He was interred at Davison Cemetery.

References

1923 births
2007 deaths
Burials in Michigan
Baptists from Michigan
Mayors of places in Michigan
Michigan city council members
Military personnel from Michigan
United States Army personnel of World War II
People from Davison, Michigan
People from Charlevoix, Michigan
Michigan State University alumni
Amherst College alumni
Republican Party members of the Michigan House of Representatives
20th-century American politicians
20th-century Baptists